This is a list of schools in the Roman Catholic Archdiocese of San Antonio.

High schools
 Antonian College Preparatory High School, Castle Hills (Est. 1964)
 Central Catholic Marianist High School, San Antonio (Est. 1852)
 Holy Cross of San Antonio, San Antonio (Est. 1957)
 Incarnate Word High School, San Antonio (Est. 1881)
 Our Lady of the Hills High School, Kerrville (Est. 2013)
 Providence High School, San Antonio (Est. 1951)
 St. Anthony Catholic High School, San Antonio (Est. 1903)
 St. Gerard Catholic High School, San Antonio (Est. 1927)
 John Paul II Catholic High School, Schertz (Est. 2009)

Grade schools
 In San Antonio
 Blessed Sacrament Catholic School
 Holy Name Catholic School
 Holy Spirit Catholic School
 Little Flower Catholic School
 Mount Sacred Heart Catholic School
 Our Lady of Perpetual Help School
 St. Anthony Catholic School (Est. 1907)
 St. Jose Sanchez del Rio Catholic School
 St. Gregory the Great Catholic School
 St. James the Apostle Catholic School
 St. John Berchmans Catholic School
 St. John Bosco Catholic School
 St. Luke Catholic School
 St. Mary Magdalen Catholic School
 St. Matthew Catholic School
 St. Monica Catholic School
 St. Paul Catholic School
 St. Peter, Prince of the Apostles School
 St. Pius X Catholic School
 St. Thomas More Catholic School

 Outside of San Antonio
 Notre Dame Catholic School (Kerrville)
 Our Lady of Grace Catholic School (Pleasanton)
 Sacred Heart School (Del Rio)
 Sacred Heart School (Floresville)
 Sacred Heart School (Uvalde)
 St. James Catholic School (Seguin)
 St. Louis Catholic School (Castroville)
 St. Mary Catholic School (Fredericksburg)
 Sts. Peter and Paul Catholic School (New Braunfels)

Former schools
 St. Francis Academy - High school for girls
 St. Mary's School by the Riverwalk (1910–2004)

References

External links
 Roman Catholic Archdiocese of San Antonio

San Antonio, Roman Catholic Archdiocese of
Education in San Antonio
Schools
Schools in the Roman Catholic Archdoicese of San Antonio